Dorothy Morland (1906-1999) was the director of the Institute of Contemporary Arts (ICA) from 1952 to 1968, its first female director. Her biographer Anna Massey contends that Morland was "the protector and advocate of the Independent Group (art movement), which met at the ICA from 1952-5", and that if the Independent Group are considered the "Fathers of Pop" then she could be considered the "Mother of Pop"; her obituary in the Guardian referred to her as "'guardian angel' to the pop art movement". During her tenure she also gave early shows to Max Ernst, Jackson Pollock and Henri Cartier-Bresson.

After leaving the ICA she worked on assembling and securing the organisation’s archives, now stored in the archive of Tate Britain as the "Dorothy Morland Collection".

References 

1906 births
1999 deaths
Women arts administrators
British arts administrators